Névé Nunatak is an isolated nunatak just north of Halfway Nunatak, between the Upper Staircase and the east side of Skelton Névé. Surveyed in 1957 by the New Zealand Northern Survey party of the Commonwealth Trans-Antarctic Expedition (1956–58) and named for its association with Skelton Névé.

Nunataks of the Ross Dependency
Hillary Coast